Gideon's Trumpet is a 1980 American made-for-television historical drama film based on the biographical book of the same name written by Anthony Lewis. The film depicts the historical events before and during the 1963 United States Supreme Court case of Gideon v. Wainwright that brought the right of an attorney to criminal defendants who could not afford it and did not meet special requirements to get one for free. After the ruling, implements of the case were enacted publicly, nationally, and even globally.

The film, distributed by Worldvision Enterprises, premiered on April 30, 1980, on CBS-TV as a Hallmark Hall of Fame film. The feature stars Henry Fonda as the titular Clarence Earl Gideon, José Ferrer as Abe Fortas, and John Houseman as the Chief Justice of the United States. Other notable actors in the film included Fay Wray, Sam Jaffe, and Dean Jagger. Robert L. Collins directed the film. It was produced and written under the direction of John Houseman and David W. Rintels. The film was recognized and nominated for three Primetime Emmy Awards the same year it premiered on television on September 7, 1980.

Plot 
The story starts with the title character Clarence Earl Gideon (played by Henry Fonda) looking into the camera and remarking how he would try to give a full account of his situation, even though he may not remember everything. The film shifts to a bar in Panama City, Florida in the summer of 1961 where several people notice the pool room was broken into and money stolen from the register. This leads to the arrest of Gideon, who was seen using a nearby payphone the same night that the pool room was broken into. 

On the day of his trial, he asks for a defense attorney to be assigned to represent him because he cannot afford to pay one himself, but Judge Robert McCrary (played by Richard Mackenzie) refuses his request even though Gideon claims that it is his right to have an attorney in his trial. After the cross-examinations of witnesses against and for Gideon and much deliberation from the jury based on how Gideon represented himself in the trial, Gideon is convicted and sentenced to five years in state prison. While there, Gideon often visits the prison's library, and researches how the law of the United States plays out, gaining support and reverence from his fellow inmates.

From all this research, he makes arrangements to write a writ of certiorari petition to the Supreme Court. The Chief Justice (played by John Houseman) and the other eight justices review other petitions before they come across Gideon's.  Before they decide to follow through with his petition, the justices debate whether or not they can argue for a case where a right to an attorney is given to everyone, regardless of special qualifications. Gideon receives the letter stating that they have accepted to hear his case. In order to collect more information, Abe Fortas (played by José Ferrer) asks Gideon for a biography in order to see if he has any special circumstances. Once this personal information is received, Fortas soon realizes that Gideon does not match any special circumstances. Fortas goes to trial against the prosecutor, and wins the case so Gideon can be tried again, this time with an attorney.

While Gideon is disappointed by having to go through a retrial, he is given an excellent attorney in the area by the name of Fred Turner (played by Lane Smith). At the second trial, Gideon declares that the retrial was unconstitutional and falls under double jeopardy. Unfortunately for Gideon, the judge says that the retrial does not fall under double jeopardy and allows the re-trial to proceed. The prosecuting team gives their remarks and discussed matters in almost the same way they did at Gideon's first trial. Turner notes a credibility flaw in one of the main witnesses and receives more information from other individuals that had previously been questioned. Turner is able to shed some light on newly found evidence and other information in regards to what happened on the night of the robbery. After some time, the jury decides that Gideon is not guilty and he is released from prison. Gideon walks out of the courthouse, content and relieved.

As the camera pans out, a narrator reads the following quote by Robert F. Kennedy:

Cast 
Henry Fonda as Clarence Earl Gideon
José Ferrer as Abe Fortas
John Houseman as Chief Justice
Fay Wray as Edna Curtis
Sam Jaffe as First Supreme Court Justice
Dean Jagger as Sixth Supreme Court Justice
Nicholas Pryor as Jacob
William Prince as Fifth Supreme Court Justice
Lane Smith as Fred Turner
Richard McKenzie as Judge Robert McCrary
Dolph Sweet as Charlie
Ford Rainey as Second Supreme Court Justice
David Sheiner as Abe Krash
J. Patrick McNamara as Harris
Les Lannom as Bobby Earl

Anthony Lewis, the author of Gideon's Trumpet, also made a cameo role as a reporter in the ending scenes of the film.

Historical background 

Before Gideon v. Wainwright, there was a history of cases related to the right of counsel that were involved in criminal procedure in the United States. During the time of the case, there was a political shift toward how much the federal government could control in regards to federal law, which is shown by the Warren Court. In regards to how well the film depicts the case historically, the film does not mention the name of the Chief Justice, but the Chief Justice of the United States at that time was Earl Warren. In the public recently, the case has differing opinions among many scholars into how well it is implemented. In the United States, measures have been taken to ensure that the case could apply to the state laws and federal laws included in the United States Constitution. Globally, the case has tried to make changes to their policies concerning the right to counsel, but the qualifications that determine the right of counsel still vary from country-to-country.

Production

Production crew 
In addition to directing Gideon's Trumpet, Robert Collins also made major contributions in the TV show, Serpico, and the 1979 version of Acts of Violence. David R. Rintels is also very active in the television film industry. He contributed to The Senator made in 1971, and Clarence Darrow, which was worked on with Collins and John Houseman.  Rintels also helped write Fear on Trial in 1976, from which he received three Gavel Awards.

Filming 
The prison scenes in the film were captured at the Men's Correctional Facility in Chino, California using prison inmates currently in the facility as extras. The director, Robert Collins, remarks of how difficult filming was with the prison inmates as extras as "by the time, [the production crew] made four takes, [the prisoners] were very unhappy." Collins has also remarked that he took special care in filming the prison scenes by making the prison scenes more "harsh" than the court scenes because he wanted to create a "contrast" in those scenes.  Fonda, who played the title character, also made some comments about how "fascinating" it was to play the role of Clarence Gideon, even though in his past productions he had not usually played similar roles.

Reception

Release 
On April 30, 1980, the day of the premiere, a New York Times newspaper article was released to notify potential viewers. In it, John J. O'Connor compliments the show by saying "The law and its intricacies are not the most promising subjects for compelling drama. But Anthony Lewis, a writer for The New York Times, demonstrated that complex arguments and legal briefs could indeed be absorbing in his 1964 book 'Gideon's Trumpet.' And tonight at 9 o'clock on CBS-TV, an adaptation by David W. Rintels of that book makes the same point with remarkable success."

Just weeks earlier, the American Bar Association Journal released an article titled Blowing Gideon's Trumpet. Emmet Lavery highlights the producer when she writes "Rintels has won three Gavel Awards from the American Bar Association for his television productions." In May 1980, Variety magazine reviewed the television show as it was recently named in the Hallmark Hall of Fame. The author summarized the film and remarked "As propaganda for an enlightened view of civil liberties, 'Gideon's Trumpet' offers, implicitly, a sharp indictment of the Burger Court's retreat from the kinds of decisions, like the one in Gideon case, that marked the Warren Court as a sharp defender of the rights of the individual."

Critical response 
The film has a rating of 55% on Rotten Tomatoes based on 329 user ratings.  In 2007, one critic, David Cornelius, wrote "Nearly three decades since its initial broadcast, it still holds a place as a triumph of televised storytelling".

Awards and honors

See also 
 Clarence Earl Gideon
 Earl Warren
 Gideon's Trumpet (the book)

References

External links 
 
 Gideon's Trumpet on Rotten Tomatoes

1980 films
1980 television films
Primetime Emmy Awards
Films based on biographies
1980s historical films
Films about lawyers
Films set in 1963
1980s legal films
CBS network films
Hallmark Hall of Fame episodes
Films directed by Robert L. Collins